Otokar Akrep II is a Turkish multi-role vehicle produced by Otokar. There were 2 main types of Akrep II, the electric-drive type is called Akrep IIe, and the diesel-drive type is called Akrep IId. A hybrid-drive version is planned. The vehicle can also be configured as a weapon platform for quick reaction, surveillance missions, armored security, base/air defense missions and other similar missions.

History 
The electric-drive vehicle was introduced at the International Defence Industry Fair 2019 IDEF in Istanbul. The diesel-drive Akrep II was introduced at IDEF 2021.

Description 

The Akrep IId powerpack is quite unique in the military, as a U-drive has been adopted in order to shorten the pack, to fit it inside the rear engine compartment. The engine is located on the right, with the transmission on the left. The reason is to fit a 2-man turret (Cockerill CSE 90LP). It is armed with a 90 mm low pressure rifled gun with a 36 calibre barrel length, which allows direct firing as well as indirect fire at a range of 6 km with a 30° elevation.

As standard equipment Akrep II is equipped with central tire inflation, run flat inserts, ABS, air conditioning. Rear axle steering (which allows reducing the turning radius), CBRN filtration, self recovery winch, and numerous situational awareness and safety systems can be optionally equipped.

See also
Panhard CRAB
Arquus Scarabee

References

External links 
Akrep II in Otokar website

All-wheel-drive vehicles
Off-road vehicles
Armoured cars
Military vehicles introduced in the 2020s
Post–Cold War military equipment of Turkey
Armoured fighting vehicles of Turkey
Battery electric vehicles
Akrep